The Tanzania Wildlife Research Institute (TAWIRI) is a state-run body which organizes wildlife research in Tanzania. The Institute is under the Ministry of Natural Resources and Tourism.

See also
Tanzania National Parks Authority
College of African Wildlife Management

References

Sources
http://www.tanzaniamammals.org/uploads/documents/Employment%20Opportunity.pdf

External links

Nature conservation in Tanzania